The E-series was a line of inline four-cylinder automobile engines designed and built by Honda for use in their cars in the 1970s and 1980s. These engines were notable for the use of CVCC technology, introduced in the ED1 engine in the 1975 Civic, which met 1970s emissions standards without using a catalytic converter.

The CVCC ED1 was on the Ward's 10 Best Engines of the 20th century list.

EA
Also see the Japanese Wikipedia entry

The EA-series is a water-cooled  inline two-cylinder engine replacing the N360's air-cooled  engine. An SOHC design with a timing belt (replacing the chain used in the N360 engine), the EA was first seen in the 1971 Honda Life. This engine was derived from the air-cooled engine in the Honda CB450 and was adapted for water-cooled application. The displacement was reduced to be in compliance with Japanese kei car legislation that stipulated maximum engine displacement.

 1971.06-1974 Honda Life
 1972.11-1974 Honda Z

EB
The EB series was fitted to the first generation Honda Civic.

Displacement 
Bore & Stroke 
compression ratio: 8.6:1
Valve Train: SOHC 8-valve
design with a 2 barrel carburetor or 1 carburetor.
Power:  5,500 rpm
Torque:  at 4,000 rpm
Max Speed:  estimated

EB2/EB3
The EB2 and EB3 displace  and different diameter valves in the head. A CVCC version was also developed later, called the "EE".
Bore & Stroke 
Valve Train: SOHC 8-valve
design with a 2 barrel carburetor or 1 carburato
Power:  at 5,000 rpm and
Torque:  at 3,000 rpm

Applications:
EB1
 1973- Honda Civic
EB2
 1974-1979  Honda Civic
EB3
 1978-1979  Honda Civic

EC

Displaced 
Bore & Stroke .
compression ratio: 8.1, 8.4 (Van)
Valve Train: SOHC 8-valve
design with a 2 barrel carburetor.
Fel control: electric fuel pump
Power:  5,500 rpm
  5,500 rpm (1979 Civic Van)
Torque:  at 3,000 rpm
  at 3,500 rpm (1979 Civic Van)
Oil Capacity: 

EC
 1975-1979 Honda Civic 4 doors
 1975-1979 Honda Civic Van (VB)

ED

The ED series introduced the CVCC technology; it is otherwise the same as the contemporary EC engine. It displaced  and used an SOHC 12-valve design.

 ED1
 1975- Honda Civic CVCC
 ED2
 1975- Honda Civic Wagon
 ED3
 1976-1979 Honda Civic CVCC
 ED4
 1976-1979 Honda Civic Wagon

EE
It was replaced by the 1.3-liter EJ engine in 1978.

 August 1975-June 1978 Honda Civic CVCC

EF

Displaced 
Bore & Stroke 
compression ratio: 8.0:1
Valve Train: SOHC 12-valve CVCC
design with a 2 barrel carburetor.
Fel control: electric fuel pump
Power:  5,300 rpm
Torque:  at 3,000 rpm
 Cast iron block & aluminum cylinder head
 Six port cylinder head (four intake ports and two exhaust ports)
 Valve order (IEEIIEEI)
 Three barrel Keihin carburettor (1976 & 1977 had manual choke, 1978 and up cars received an automatic choke)
 Point type ignition

USAGE:  1976-1978 Honda Accord CVCC, US market automobiles.

EG

The EG displaced  and was an SOHC 8-valve engine with a 2 barrel carburetor.  Output was  @ 5000 rpm and  @ 3000 rpm.

EG

1976-1978 Honda Accord Non USDM

EH

The water-cooled SOHC two-cylinder EH was first seen installed in the first generation Honda Acty truck introduced in July 1977, and later in the 1985 Honda Today. It was based on one bank of cylinders from the horizontally opposed four used on the Honda Gold Wing GL1000 motorcycle, with which it shared the  bore.

Applications:
1977.07-1988.05 Honda Acty
1985.09-1988.02  Honda Today

EJ

Displaced 
Bore & Stroke 
compression ratio: 7.9:1
Valve Train: SOHC 12-valve auxiliary valve CVCC
Fuel Control: Electric fuel pump
Power:  5,500 rpm
Torque:  at 3,500 rpm
Max Speed:  estimated
Oil Capacity: 

EJ
 June 1978-July 1979 Honda Civic 1300 (SK/SP)
 EJ1
 July 1979-1983 Honda Civic CVCC

EK
The EK was an SOHC 12-valve (CVCC) engine, displacing . Output varied (see below) as the engine itself was refined.  This was the last CVCC configuration engine manufactured by Honda.

Displaced 
Bore & Stroke 
compression ratio: 8.8:1
design with a 2 barrel carburetor.
Fuel control: electric fuel pump
Power:  5,500 rpm
Torque:  at 3,000 rpm
 Cast iron block & aluminum cylinder head
 Three barrel Keihin carburetor (all were automatic choke)
 Electronic ignition (Nippon Denso or Tek Electronics)
 Oil cooler (or provision for this in the block)

 Cylinder head iterations:
 Six port cylinder head (4 intake port / 2 exhaust ports) & IEEIIEEI valve order for 1979 & 1980 49 state
 Eight Port cylinder head (4 intake port / 4 exhaust ports) & IEEIIEEI valve order for 1980 (California only) and 1981 (50 states)
 Eight Port cylinder head (4 intake port / 4 exhaust ports) & EIEIIEIE valve order from 1982 to end of CVCC production (1985)
The revised 4-port (82 & later) had another slight horsepower increase.

USAGE:
1979-1983 Honda Accord CVCC (US market)
1979-1982 Honda Prelude CVCC (US market)
1981-1983 Honda Accord/Vigor (JDM)

EK9 is not related to the EK engine; EK is also the chassis code for several versions of the sixth generation Honda Civic. EK9 is the chassis code for 1997-2000 Honda Civic Type R.

EL

The EL displaced  and was an SOHC eight-valve engine with a two-barrel carburetor.

Displaced 
Bore & Stroke 
compression ratio: 8.4:1
Valve Train: SOHC 8-valve
design with a 2 barrel carburetor.
Fel control: electric fuel pump
Power:  SAE at 5,000 rpm
Torque:  at 3,000 rpm
Oil Capacity: 

 EL1
 1979-1983 Honda Accord Non USDM
 1979-1982 Honda Prelude (Australian and Canadian models) Non USDM

EM

Displaced 
Bore & Stroke 
compression ratio: 8.8:1
Valve Train: SOHC 12-valve auxiliar valve CVCC
design with a 2 barrel carburetor or 3 barrel carburetor.
Fel control: electric fuel pump
Power:  5,500 rpm
Torque:  at 3,500 rpm
Oil Capacity: 

 EM1
 1980 Honda Civic, 
 1981-1983 Honda Civic,

EN

The EN displaced . It had a single overhead cam and eight-valve head, and was fitted to Civics in all markets aside from the United States domestic market. In Europe it also found a home in the Honda Ballade-based Triumph Acclaim. Both block and head are from aluminium.

EN1
1980-1983 Honda Civic, single carb, 
EN4
1981-1984 Honda Civic S and Triumph Acclaim, twin carb,

EP
The EP was an SOHC 12-valve (CVCC) engine, displacing . It was essentially an EL 1.6 L block with an EK 1.8 L cylinder head.  

Displaced 
Bore & Stroke 
compression ratio: 8.8:1
Valve Train: SOHC 12-valve
design with a 3 barrel carburetor.
Fel control: electric fuel pump
Power:  5,300 rpm
Torque:  at 3,000 rpm
Oil Capacity: 
EP
1980-1985  Honda Quintet / Quint (Japan)
1980-1983 Honda Accord 1600 / Vigor 1600

ER

The long-stroke ER four-cylinder engine,
 sold as a 12-valve CVCC-II in Japan and as a simple eight-valve unit in Europe and Asia,
was only used in the AA/VF/FA series City/Jazz from 1981 until 1986.
It was available as a normally aspirated carburated version or with Honda's own PGM-FI fuel injection as one of a very few turbocharged engines built by Honda.
The Japanese market CVCC engine was also known as COMBAX, an acronym of COMpact Blazing-combustion AXiom. The E-series were tuned for economy, with higher gearing and later on with computer-controlled variable lean burn.
As of March 1985, the naturally aspirated ER engines gained composite conrods (a world first in a production car), lighter and stronger these helped further reduce fuel consumption.

The lower powered engines in the commercial "Pro" series had a lower compression, a mechanically timed ignition rather than the breakerless setup found in the passenger cars, and a manual choke. The ER had five crankshaft bearings and the overhead camshaft was driven by a cogged belt.

Carburetor versions used either a single or 2bbl downdraft Keihin. The turbocharger in the Turbo and Turbo II was developed together with IHI, the Turbo II being equipped with an intercooler and a computer-controlled wastegate.

ER1-4 Honda City

ES

The ES displaced . All ES engines were SOHC 12-valve engines. The ES1 used dual sidedraft carburetors to produce  @ 5500 rpm and  @ 4000 rpm. The ES2 replaced this with a standard 3 barrel carburetor for  @ 5800 rpm and  @ 3500 rpm. Finally, the ES3 used PGM-FI for  @ 5800 rpm and  @ 2500 rpm.

 ES1
 1983-1984 Honda Prelude
 ES2
 1984-1985 Honda Accord
 ES3
 1985- Honda Accord SE-i
 1981-1985 Honda Vigor VTL-i, VT-i, TT-i (Japan)

ET

The ET displaced  and was an SOHC 12-valve engine. ET1 had a single, downdraft carb with 4-1 exhaust manifold. JDM versions included a triple-barrel carburetted version for the Accord ( at 5,800 rpm) and one with Honda PGM-FI which produced  at 5,800 rpm.

 ET
 1983-1985 Honda Accord
 1983-1987 Honda Prelude

EV

It was available in all bodystyles of the third generation Honda Civic.

 EV1
 1983-1986 Honda Civic
 1983-1986 Honda CRX
 EV2
 1984-1990 Rover 213 
 1983-186 Honda Civic

EW

The final E-family engine was the EW, presented along with the all new third generation Honda Civic in September 1983. Displacing , the EWs were SOHC 12-valve engines. The "EW" name was replaced by the Honda D15 series, with the EW (1, 2, 3, 4, and 5) renamed to D15A (1, 2, 3, 4, and 5) in 1987. It also received a new engine stamp placement on the front of the engine like the "modern D series" (1988+).

 EW1
 1983-1985 Honda Civic/CRX DX (unlabeled)
 1983-1986 Honda Civic
 1983-1986 Honda Shuttle
 EW2
 1983-1987 Honda Civic non-CVCC (CDM)
 EW3
 1985- Honda Civic/CRX Si non-CVCC
 EW4
 1985-1986 Honda CRX Si non-CVCC
 1986 Honda Civic Si non-CVCC
 EW5
 similar to the EW1, Fuel injected CVCC 12-Valve 4 Aux valves. A third throttle plate in the throttle body supplied intake air to a 5th injector which powered the CVCC ports, The rated power is different between the Civic and the CR-X: the Civic makes  at 5800 rpm and  torque at 4000 rpm, the CR-X made  at 5800 rpm and  torque at 4500 rpm. Differences in power are largely down to a more efficient exhaust system on the CR-X it used a factory cast iron 4-2-1 extractor went through a catalytic converter further down the exhaust system and had twin exit tail pipes. The Civic had a short 4-1 design into a catalytic converter and single pipe exit. There was a revised intake manifold for vehicles produced in 1986 and 1987. The EW5 was only available in Japan. It came in the following models: CR-X 1.5i, Civic 25i Hatchback, Ballade CRi Sedan.

ZA
The ZA1 and ZA2 are anomalously named, but closely related to the 1.3-litre EV. With a shorter stroke but the same bore , this  shared most of the EV's characteristics. It was only sold in the third generation Civic in European and various smaller markets where the taxation structure suited this version. There was also a low-octane model, producing  at 6000 rpm.

 1984-1987 Honda Civic hatchback (AL)
 1984-1987 Honda Civic saloon (AM)

See also

 List of Honda engines

References

E

ja:ホンダ・E型エンジン
Straight-four engines
Gasoline engines by model
Straight-twin engines